Into the Flame is the fourth EP by Australian musician Matt Corby, released on 11 November 2011 by Universal Music Australia. It peaked at number 3 on the ARIA Charts and spent a total of 51 weeks in the chart.

Critical reception
Hannah Spencer from Contactmusic.com said, "despite [the EP's] lush calmness, [it] lacks anything distinctly memorable, merely dusted with meandering melodies, but with every subsequent listen it grows and grows - a real tease." Scott Williams from Beat magazine called the album "a breath of fresh air in the Australian music industry." Hugh from Indie Shuffle wrote, "Into the Flame highlights his growth as an artist, with four beautifully assembled tracks."

Track listing
All songs written by Matt Corby and produced by Tim Carr.

Credits and personnel
Credits adapted from the liner notes of Into the Flame.
Matt Corby – vocals, guitar, artwork, writer
Tim Carr – producer, mixer
Simon Todkill – engineer
Andrew Edgson – mastering
Tim Coghill – drums
Bree Tranter – keyboard, background vocals, guest vocals on "Big Eyes"
Tristan Thorne – bass
Nathan Johnson – art direction, illustrations

Charts

Certifications

References

2011 EPs
Matt Corby albums